Jeremy Redmore is a New Zealand musician, singer-songwriter, producer and author. In his early career he rose to fame as the main creative force behind the band Midnight Youth. Since then he has released two albums as a solo artist as well as a music-themed children's picture book.

Background
Redmore was born in Auckland before receiving his education at Tauranga Boys' College and the University of Auckland.

Music career

Midnight Youth 2006–2012

Redmore started making an impact in New Zealand's music scene in 2006 after joining New Zealand rock band Midnight Youth. Their platinum-selling debut album The Brave Don't Run peaked at number 2 in the RIANZ New Zealand Album Chart and included two top 20, gold-selling singles, All On Our Own and "The Letter". The band won the Best Rock Album award, Best Group award and Best Engineer award at the 2009 New Zealand Music Awards as well as a Silver Scroll for the most-played song of 2009. In 2011 they released their second album World Comes Calling before Redmore quit the band to pursue a solo career in late 2012. In November 2019, Midnight Youth announced Redmore and the band would be reuniting for a one-off show in Auckland, New Zealand - their first in over seven years since the band broke up.

Solo career 2012–present
Redmore released his largely self-produced. debut solo album, Clouds Are Alive, in July 2014 which reached number six on the Official New Zealand Music Chart and spawned hit single "Bad Philosophy". At the end of April 2014, Redmore opened for Ed Sheeran at his iHeartRadio showcase at Auckland's ASB Theatre. The third single from the record, "One Day Alone", was released with a music video created by seven different directors from across the world. Before 2015 Redmore performed at a number of New Zealand celebrity weddings including those of Mike Hosking, Dane Rumble and Angela Dotchin. Redmore also featured on two tracks for hip hop artist PNC (rapper) - Fame Kills All and Lit / Slow Down.

After going over five years without releasing new music, Redmore announced via a series of cryptic videos on his social media pages that he would be releasing a new project titled The Brightest Flame from November 2019. The album was released in five separate chapters over the course of just over four months, and tells a story of heartbreak and healing. The Brightest Flame, came together as a full album on March 20, 2020 and was released under Redmore's own record label. The album was promoted with a variety of creative marketing initiatives including a collaboration with the Museum of Broken Relationships in Dunedin, an "Unhappy Hour" event alongside Valentine's Day in Auckland  as well as an initiative called "Songs to your Steps" to help those isolated by the COVID-19 pandemic in Auckland.

Then, over the course of six weeks during the lockdown measures taken by New Zealand's government in response to COVID-19, Redmore wrote 12 songs  based on stories submitted anonymously by the general public about their isolation and lockdown experiences; as part of a project called "Telltale Tunes".

In October 2020, Redmore commissioned the release of a remix EP centred around the song "One Amongst 1000", from his album The Brightest Flame. The EP contained remixes of the song by Coldroom, Joseph Snook, Hahko and Vanguard One.

In May 2022, Redmore released his debut children's song, Sing Like A Unicorn. The song was accompanied by a mixed-media stop motion music video created by director Adam Rowland.

Sing Like A Unicorn 
Redmore's debut children's book, Sing Like A Unicorn, was released November 16, 2021 under his own publishing imprint Redmore Books Ltd.  Redmore said the book was inspired by his own journey of finding self-confidence through singing and hopes children who read the book can do the same. The book's website says it was "wholly inspired by the idea that inside each of us is a completely unique individual that can be happier, more fulfilled and make the world a better place through embracing their originality. And one of the easiest and most fun ways to do that is by singing!"

Its first edition was a limited-run hardback which sold out within two weeks of publication. On May 2, 2022, a paperback edition of the book was released alongside a song - written by Redmore - and music video, directed by Adam Rowland.

TV
Redmore has presented two nationally broadcast television shows in New Zealand. The first aired primarily across Air New Zealand's inflight entertainment system in April 2013 – B-Guided TV's sixth season involved Redmore visiting tourist hotspots across the country including Queenstown, Wellington and Auckland. It aired on Choice TV in August the same year. Redmore's second major television job was presenting the 2014 Smokefree Rockquest television series which first aired 1 November 2014 on channel FOUR

In 2021 Redmore appeared as a vocal coach and mentor on the second season of TVNZ's Popstars.

Theatre
In November 2014 Redmore made his theatrical stage debut with the role of Simon Zealotes in the Kensington Swan Season of Auckland Theatre Company's production of Jesus Christ Superstar. The show ran for six weeks and 55 shows at Auckland's Q Theatre.

Discography

With Midnight Youth 

 The Brave Don't Run (2009) Warner Music NZ
 World Comes Calling (2011) Warner Music NZ

Albums

References

External links 
 Jeremy Redmore at Instagram
 Jeremy Redmore at Facebook
 Jeremy Redmore home website

New Zealand television presenters
People educated at Tauranga Boys' College
Living people
New Zealand songwriters
Male songwriters
1983 births
21st-century New Zealand male singers